The eMLS Cup is an esports tournament held by Major League Soccer in conjunction with the EA Sports FIFA franchise. The tournament serves as an official league qualifier for the FIFA eWorld Cup.

History

2018 eMLS Cup 
The 2018 eMLS Cup ran from April 5–8 at the PAX East gaming festival at the Boston Convention and Exhibition Center in Boston, Massachusetts. The tournament was contested by representatives of 19 MLS clubs divided into their respective Eastern and Western Conferences. Competitors were required to have three MLS players on the field at all times, including two players from the club that they represented. An initial preliminary regular season saw players play each other twice in a round robin format before the top eight teams from each conference progressed to a knockout phase. Both eMLS Cup finalists won berths in the Global Series Playoffs, the qualifying tournament for the 2018 FIFA eWorld Cup, with the winner also receiving $10,000 prize money.

2019 eMLS Cup 
The 2019 eMLS Cup Finals were held on March 30 at the PAX East gaming festival at The Castle at Park Plaza in Boston, Massachusetts. The tournament was contested by representatives of 22 MLS clubs divided into their respective Eastern and Western Conferences. Competitors were required to have three MLS players on the field at all times. The format consisted of two prior series earlier in the year with the final standings combining the regular season conference records from Series 1 and 2 with one final regular season played at the 2019 eMLS Cup finals itself against players from the opposite conference. The top five players in each conference based on their aggregated record from Series 1 and Series 2, the resultant bonus points, and the eMLS Cup regular season, qualified for the knockout phase of the tournament with the top two gaining first-round byes. The remaining players competed in a last chance qualifying bracket for the final place in each conference's knockout phase. The overall winner received $15,000 prize money.

Past winners

References

External links 
 eMLS Cup

Major League Soccer
FIFA (video game series) competitions